Kvk, KvK, or KVK may refer to:

Kinderen voor Kinderen, a Dutch children's choir
Karlsruher Virtueller Katalog, a book search engine
Kriegsverdienstkreuz, literally War Merit Cross, a war medal from Nazi Germany
Kamer van Koophandel, the Dutch chamber of commerce
K.V. Kortrijk, a Belgian association football club
Krishi Vigyan Kendra, agricultural extension centers in India
K. V. Kandaswamy (1926–2008), an Indian politician